The Red Crusader incident was a 1961 maritime dispute between Denmark and the United Kingdom over fishing rights.

Background 
On 27 April 1959, the British and Danish governments exchanged notes in Copenhagen establishing temporary regulations on fishing around the Faroe Islands.

Events of 29 May 
On 29 May 1961 at 17:39, the British fishing trawler Red Crusader was arrested by the Danish frigate Niels Ebbesen for fishing in the waters off the Faroe Islands. Instead of heading towards Tórshavn, as instructed by the Danish frigate, the British trawler headed for Scotland. The Danish frigate pursued the trawler, and fired warning shots to no avail. The Danish frigate then fired an aimed shot, damaging the trawler. The Danish frigate commander was E. Sølling and the British trawler skipper was Mr Wood.

Commission 
On 15 November 1961, the British and Danish governments established an adversarial international commission of inquiry into the incident. This was the first international commission since the Tavignano inquiry in 1922.

Proceedings were divided into a written and an oral stage.

The commission delivered its report in March 1962 and found no evidence of illegal fishing. Further, the commission found that the Niels Ebbesen had used excessive force, beyond that justified by international law in firing on the trawler.

See also 

 Cod Wars, a series of fishing disputes between the United Kingdom and Iceland in the North Atlantic Ocean.

References

Further reading 

 

Maritime incidents in 1961
International maritime incidents
Denmark–United Kingdom relations